Zaffar Ahmed Khan Kamali is a Pakistani politician who had been a Member of the Provincial Assembly of Sindh, from August 2013 to May 2018.

Early life and education

He was born on 16 October 1962 in Mirpur Khas.

He has a degree of Bachelor of Medicine, Bachelor of Surgery from Jinnah Sindh Medical University.

Political career

He was elected to the Provincial Assembly of Sindh as a candidate of Mutahida Quami Movement from Constituency PS-64 MIRPUR KHAS-I in by-polls held in August 2013.

References

Living people
Sindh MPAs 2013–2018
1962 births
Muttahida Qaumi Movement politicians